This is a list of those who have held the post of Lord Lieutenant of the City of Dublin, a position created in 1831. The title is pronounced as 'Lord Lef-tenant'.

Lords Lieutenant
Dublin
Lord Lieutenants
Dublin, Lord Lieutenants
 Lord Lieutenants
Lord Lieutenants
Dublin, Lord Lieutenants